Lewis Henry Lapham (March 13, 1858 – June 10, 1934) was an American entrepreneur who made a fortune consolidating smaller business in the leather industry. He was also one of the founders of Texaco Oil Company.

Biography
Lapham was born in Brooklyn, New York, the son of Samantha Lapham (née Vail) and Henry Griffith Lapham, who were second cousins.

He built Waveny House in New Canaan, Connecticut, as a summer residence for his family to escape the heat of New York City. The mansion and property are now a public park and arts center in New Canaan.

Lapham was the father of San Francisco mayor Roger Lapham, the grandfather of actor Christopher Lloyd and banking executive Lewis A. Lapham, and the great-grandfather of both Lewis H. Lapham and Sam Lloyd.

References 

1858 births
1934 deaths
American people of English descent
American businesspeople
People from New Canaan, Connecticut
Texaco people
People from Brooklyn